Digital Crimes (2002) is an album by Memorain.

Track listing
All songs written by Ilias Papadakis, except "Digital Crimes", "Last War - Final Day", written by Ilias Papadakis and Kostas Bagiatis, and "Visions Of Darkness", written by Ilias Papadakis and Panos Andricopoulos

"Digital Crimes"
"Until You Die"
"Bones"
"Alone"
"Turned On You"
"Extend Of Life"
"Burning Justice"
"Last War - Final Day"
"Silence"
"Visions Of Darkness"

Credits
 Ilias Papadakis     - Guitars, Vocals  
 Alex Doutsis     - Guitars  
 Kostas Bagiatis - Bass  
 Panos Andricopoulos    - Drums

References

2003 albums
Memorain albums